Robin James Hulbert (born 14 March 1980) is an English former footballer who played as a midfielder. He played 297 games in a 17-year career in the Football League and Conference.

Signing professional forms with Swindon Town in 1996, he spent four years with the club, also spending a brief time on loan at Newcastle United in 1998. Joining Bristol City in 2000, he moved on to Telford United in 2003, following a loan spell at Shrewsbury Town. He transferred to Port Vale in 2004, and stayed with the club for the next four injury-blighted years. Spending the 2008–09 season with Darlington, he moved on to Barrow in 2009. He stayed for three seasons, and again struggled with injuries. He had a brief spell with Worcester City, before making a brief return to Barrow in August 2013.

Career
Born in Plymouth, Hulbert started his career with Everton. In August 1996, he was signed by First Division Swindon Town on the agreement that Swindon would pay the "Toffees" £25,000 for every 30 games Hulbert played. He made his senior debut for the club on 25 September 1996, making a substitute appearance in a 3–1 win over Queens Park Rangers in the League Cup. He made his league debut on 18 October 1997, in a 3–1 defeat at Wolverhampton Wanderers, replacing Scott Leitch on 37 minutes. His next appearance was in a 1–1 draw with Port Vale at The County Ground on 29 August 1998, as he won his first start. He went on to make a further seventeen appearances in 1998–99. After thirteen games in 1999–2000, he was sold to Bristol City in March 2000 for a £25,000 fee.

In his first full season with City he made just 21 appearances, having struggled to overcome a groin injury. He went on to have a quiet 2001–02, making just sixteen appearances in all competitions. In April 2003, he was loaned out to Third Division Shrewsbury Town. Overall in 2002–03 he made seven appearances for the "Shrews" and ten appearances for City. Placed on the transfer list by boss Danny Wilson in August 2003, he left for Conference side Telford United on a free transfer three months later. He scored his first competitive goal whilst at Telford, bagging the only goal of the game against Dagenham & Redbridge on 29 November. He went on to play 22 games for Telford in 2003–04, before the club folded in the summer.

His return to the Football League came in July 2004, when he signed with Port Vale in League One, following a trial period. He played 27 times in his maiden season as a "Valiant". Due to a broken foot he played just the one game in 2005–06, turning up for a defeat at home to Hartlepool United on 29 October. Nevertheless, he was offered a six-month contract at the end of the season, having proved his fitness to the management team. He returned to action in 2006–07, scoring one goal – against Crewe Alexandra – in twenty games. He was offered a new one-year contract at the end of the campaign; manager Martin Foyle and his assistant Dean Glover both felt that Hulbert had "a lot to offer the team", and that "he dictates and he puts his foot in for us but he can also play and retain the ball". He made only 24 appearances in 2007–08, having suffered a broken collarbone in mid-season, and was not retained beyond the end of the season.

He signed with Darlington in August 2008, but started only 13 of his 33 games for the League Two side throughout the 2008–09 campaign. In June 2009, Hulbert signed a two-year contract with Conference National side Barrow. After 37 league appearances, at the end of the season he played at Wembley Stadium in the FA Trophy final victory over Stevenage Borough. During the game he was sent off for a challenge on striker Charlie Griffin at the end of normal time, in which he led into the challenge with his elbow, knocking out Griffin. Hulbert stated leading with elbows is "just a part of his game" – leaving Griffin needing stitches around his left eye, a broken nose and broken cheekbone. Barrow manager Darren Sheridan defended Hulbert on Radio 5 Live, saying "he's not that sort of player". He was restricted to twenty appearances in 2010–11 due to suspension and a groin injury. At the end of the campaign he signed up for the 2011–12 season. However he picked up a cruciate ligament injury in his knee in October 2011, and was ruled out for the rest of the season; a despondent Hulbert said "I feel I have let the managers and supporters down with the injury." In February he began helping out manager David Bayliss following the departure of joint-manager Darren Sheridan.

In November 2012, he joined Worcester City. However he played just 60 minutes of football for the "Dragons". He returned to Barrow on non-contract terms at the start of the 2013–14 season, following their relegation to the Conference North. Three games into the season he announced his retirement for a second time.

Post-retirement
After his second and final retirement from football he founded the Sporting Stars Academy in Stoke-on-Trent with former teammate Shane Tudor.

Career statistics

Honours
Barrow
FA Trophy: 2010

References

1980 births
Living people
Footballers from Plymouth, Devon
English footballers
Association football midfielders
England youth international footballers
Swindon Town F.C. players
Newcastle United F.C. players
Bristol City F.C. players
Shrewsbury Town F.C. players
Telford United F.C. players
Port Vale F.C. players
Darlington F.C. players
Worcester City F.C. players
Barrow A.F.C. players
English Football League players
National League (English football) players